Chris Richey (born September 1, 1971, in Benton, Arkansas) is an American Democratic politician and former member of the Arkansas House of Representatives.

Education
Richey earned his BA in history and political science from Ouachita Baptist University and his MA in history from Arkansas State University.

Elections
2012 When District 12 Representative Robert Moore left the Legislature and left the seat open, Richey won the May 22, 2012 Democratic Primary with 2,082 votes (55.5%), and was unopposed for the November 6, 2012 General election, winning with 6,450 votes.

Richey resigned June 30, 2020 after moving out of the district for a new job.

References

External links
Official page at the Arkansas House of Representatives

Chris Richey at Ballotpedia
Chris Richey at the National Institute on Money in State Politics

1971 births
Living people
Democratic Party members of the Arkansas House of Representatives
Ouachita Baptist University alumni
People from Benton, Arkansas
People from West Helena, Arkansas
Arkansas State University alumni
21st-century American politicians